Luiz Fernando de Souza, commonly known as Luiz Fernando Pezão or even Pezão (English: Bigfoot) (born 29 March 1958) is an entrepreneur, politician and former governor of the state of Rio de Janeiro. He was succeeded by acting Governor Francisco Dornelles from 28 March 2016 to 31 October 2016.

Pezão has a degree in Administration and became a politician in the 1980s, as councillor of Piraí. He then served two times as mayor of the town.

In 2006, Pezão was chosen by Sérgio Cabral, then candidate to the governorship of Rio de Janeiro, to be his running mate. They won the election and Pezão took office as Vice Governor and State Secretary of Public Works simultaneously.

He assumed the office of governor due to the resignation of Sérgio Cabral, that at the time had plans to run for the senate).

Pezão is a member of the Brazilian Democratic Movement, one of the most powerful political parties of the country.

He was reelected governor in the 2014 gubernatorial election, running against former governor Anthony Garotinho, and the senators Lindberg Farias and Marcelo Crivella.

On 29 November 2018, after a request of the Prosecutor General of the Republic Raquel Dodge, accepted by the Justice of the Superior Court of Justice Felix Fischer, Pezão was arrested by the Federal Police in a new phase of Operation Car Wash, named Operation Werewolf (Operação Boca de Lobo). Pezão is accused of proceeding with corruption schemes that began during the government of Sérgio Cabral. As his term ends on 31 December 2018, Vice Governor Francisco Dornelles took office as Acting Governor.

References

Profile of the Governor of Rio de Janeiro

|-

1955 births
Living people
Brazilian engineers
Governors of Rio de Janeiro (state)
Vice Governors of Rio de Janeiro (state)
Brazilian Democratic Movement politicians
Brazilian politicians convicted of corruption